The following is a timeline of the history of the city of Palermo, Sicily, Italy.

Prior to 19th century

 734 BC - Phoenicians found Palermo
415 BC – Carthaginians in power, but continue using Greek name Panormos on the city's coins.
 276 BC – Conquered by Pyrrhus of Epirus.
 275 BC – Carthaginian reconquest.
 254 BC – Romans take Palermo under the Latin name Panormus.
 251 BC – Attempted Carthaginian reconquest fails in the Battle of Panormus.
 1st century AD – Catholic Diocese of Palermo established.
 440 – Vandal siege and conquest of Panormus.
 535 – Byzantine siege and conquest of Panormus.
 830 – August: Arabs begin siege of Palermo.
 831 – August: Saracens in power.
 1072 – Normans take Palermo.
 1130 – Palermo becomes capital of the Kingdom of Sicily.
 1136 – San Giovanni degli Eremiti church built.
 1140 – Cappella Palatina consecrated.
 1143 – Martorana church founded.
 1160 – Chiesa di San Cataldo (church) built.
 1185 – Palermo Cathedral construction begins.
 1191 –  active.
 1282 
 30 March: Sicilian Vespers uprising against Anjou rule. 
 4 September: Peter I crowned as king of Sicily in Palermo Cathedral.
 1330 – Palazzo Sclafani built.
 1394 – University established.
 1460 – Porta Nuova (Palermo) (gate) built.
 1477 – Printing press in operation (approximate date).
 1557 – September: Flood.(it)
 1584 – Fontana Pretoria (fountain) installed in the Piazza Pretoria.
 1620 – Quattro Canti laid out.
 1676 – 2 June: Naval Battle of Palermo occurs offshore.
 1693 – 1693 Sicily earthquake.
 1726 – Earthquake.
 1734 – 2 September: Spanish conquest.
 1735 – 3 July: Charles V crowned as king of Sicily in Palermo Cathedral.
 1740 – Earthquake.
 1760 – Allegorical Apotheosis of Palermo artwork painted in the Palazzo Isnello.
 1790 – Palermo Astronomical Observatory founded.
 1795 – Botanical Garden of Palermo opens.

19th century

 1801 – Astronomer Piazzi discovers Ceres (dwarf planet).
 1806 – University of Palermo established.
 1837 – Cholera epidemic.
 1848 – 12 January: Sicilian revolution of 1848 begins.
 1849 – 13 May: "Neapolitans capture Palermo."
 1860
 6 June: Forces of Garibaldi take Palermo.
 Giornale di Sicilia newspaper begins publication.
 1861
  opens.
 Population: 199,911.
 1866 – Anti-government unrest; crackdown.
 1871 – Population: 219,938.
 1873 –  (history society) founded.
 1886 – Palermo Centrale railway station opens.
 1891 – 15 November: Esposizione Nazionale di Palermo (exhibit) opens.
 1897
 Teatro Massimo opens.
 Population: 287,972.
 1900 – L'Ora newspaper begins publication.(it)
 US Città di Palermo was founded by Ignazio Majo Pagano

20th century

 1901 – Population: 309,566.
 1906 - First edition of Targa Florio.
 1919 - Gonzaga Institute, Palermo founded by Jesuits. 
 1930 – Cinema Orfeo opens.
 1931
 February: .
 Palermo–Boccadifalco Airport opens.
 1932 – Stadio Littorio (stadium) opens.
 1936 – Population: 411,879.
 1940-1945 - Palermo is bombed during the Second War World.
 1943 – 22 July: Allied forces arrive in Palermo.
 1947 – Sicilian Regional Assembly headquartered in city.
 1950s/1980s - Sack of Palermo.
 1953 – Cinema Astoria opens.
 1957 – October: Grand Hotel des Palmes Mafia meeting 1957.
 1960 – Palermo Airport opens.
 1961 – Population: 587,985.
 1970 - Mauro De Mauro disappeared.
 1971 – Population: 642,814.
 1974 – Palermo Notarbartolo railway station opens.
 1979 - Mario Francese and Boris Giuliano killed.
 1980 - Piersanti Mattarella and Gaetano Costa killed.
 1981 – Population: 701,782.
 1982 - Pio La Torre, Carlo Alberto Dalla Chiesa and his wife Emanuela Setti Carraro killed.
 1983 - Rocco Chinnici and Mario D’Aleo killed.
 1985 – Antonino Cassarà killed.
 March:  held.
 1986 – Maxi Trial begins.
 1988 – Internazionali Femminili di Palermo tennis tournament begins.
 1990 – Palermo metropolitan railway service begins operating.
 Palermo hosts some matches of 1990 World Cup.
 1991 – Population: 698,556.
 1992 – Anti-Mafia judges Giovanni Falcone and Paolo Borsellino killed.
 1993 – Pino Puglisi killed.
 Leoluca Orlando becomes mayor.

21st century

 2001 – Diego Cammarata becomes mayor.
 2006 – Paolo Romeo becomes archbishop.
 2007 – March:  held.
 2010 – UCI Palermo cinema opens.
 2012 – Leoluca Orlando becomes mayor again.
 2013 – Population: 654,987 city; 1,243,638 province.
 2015 - Palermo’s Itinerario Arabo-Normanno proclaimed World Heritage Site by Unesco.
 The Palermitan Sergio Mattarella becomes President of Italian Republic.
 2018 - Palermo is “Capitale Italiana della cultura” and hosts the 12th edition of Manifesta.
 Pope Francis visits the city.

See also
 History of Palermo
 List of mayors of Palermo
 
  (state archives)
 History of Sicily
 Timelines of other cities in the macroregion of Insular Italy:(it)
 Sardinia: Timeline of Cagliari 
 Sicily: Timeline of Catania, Messina, Syracuse, Trapani

References

Citations

This article incorporates information from the Italian Wikipedia, French Wikipedia, and German Wikipedia.

Bibliography

in English
 .
 
 
 
 
  (includes timeline)

in Italian

External links

 Europeana. Items related to Palermo, various dates.
 Digital Public Library of America. Items related to Palermo, various dates.

 
Palermo